John Michael Sherlock (January 20, 1926 – August 12, 2019) was a Canadian bishop. He was the Roman Catholic Bishop of London, Ontario, from July 8, 1978 to April 27, 2002. He was born in Regina, Saskatchewan and raised in Brantford, Ontario. Second eldest of a family of eight, four of his five brothers also studied at the seminary. Two of them, Fr William Sherlock and Fr Philip Sherlock, were ordained priests. 

Bishop Sherlock was ordained in 1950.  He became the head of the Diocese of London in 1978 - a district that includes over 130 parishes from Windsor to Huron County, with approximately 440,000 parishioners. Bishop John Sherlock's tenure was riddled with clergy sexual abuse scandals, which shone a harsh spotlight on the prevalence of historical sexual abuse within the Diocese of London.

Timeline
 January 20, 1926: Born in Regina, Saskatchewan
 June 3, 1950: Ordained priest for Diocese of Hamilton, Ontario, Canada
 June 25, 1974: Appointed Titular Bishop of Macriana in Mauretania and Auxiliary Bishop of London, Ontario, Canada
 August 28, 1974: Consecrated Titular Bishop of Macriana in Mauretania
 July 7, 1978: Appointed Bishop of London, Ontario, Canada
 August 21, 1978: Installed as Bishop of London, Ontario, Canada
 April 27, 2002: Bishop Emeritus of London, Ontario, Canada

See also
Diocese of Hamilton, Ontario
Diocese of London, Ontario

References & External links

 Catholic-Hierarchy profile
 Roman Catholic Diocese of London biography

1926 births
2019 deaths
Roman Catholic bishops of London, Ontario
People from Regina, Saskatchewan